T. G. Kamala Devi (born Thota Govindamma; 29 December 1930 – 16 August 2012), also known as Kamala Chandra Babu, was an Indian dubbing artist, playback singer and actor who primarily contributed to Telugu cinema as well as a few Tamil films.  She was also a former professional level billiards player who won the Indian Women Billiards title twice. She died of a brief illness at Chennai on 16 August 2012.

Biography
She was born in Karvetinagaram, Chittoor district, Andhra Pradesh. Her original birth name was Thota Govindamma and she later changed her name to T. G. Kamala Devi after entering the film industry. The initials "T. G." in her name represent her birth name. She married Avula Chandra Babu in 1946 and had a son named Avula Jaychander with him.

Film career

Acting
She was in a drama company and acted in some male and female roles. She has received many medals for her performances in plays. She has shifted to cinema field and acted in about 30 films most of them are minor roles. She was also a well known stage actor who performed in several plays and dramas.

Singer
She has sung several songs In Telugu and Tamil films like the Telugu-Tamil Film Pathala Bhairavi wher in Telugu she sang 'Ithihasam Vinaara' or the tamil version Ithikasam Kaetarra

Dubbing artist
She also was a popular dubbing artist and has lent her voice to actors such as Padmini, B. Saroja Devi, Lalitha and many more.

Cue sports
Kamala was one of the earliest women cue sport players in India. When the then reigning snooker world champion Horace Lindrum visited Chennai at the invitation of the Andhra Maha Sabha in 1954, circumstances led Kamala to pick up the cue and provide Mrs. Lindrum a woman opponent to play against. Soon enough, she made her way to state and national-level tournaments. Since then, she played in various open tournaments in Billiards & Snooker as the only woman player at that time, competing with men at Chennai, Vijayawada and Bangalore. She won the Indian National Billiards Women titles in 1991 and 1995. She had the unique opportunity of playing exhibition matches at Bangalore and Mysore with the then World Billiards Champion Bob Marshall. She won both her billiards national titles at the age of 62 and 66 representing the Tamil Nadu state.

Awards
 Nataka Kala Prapoorna was awarded to her by the Andhra Pradesh Nataka Academy.

Titles
 National Billiards Champion: 1991, 1995

Filmography

References

External links
 
 - T. G. Kamala Devi sings and dances in Pathala Bhairavi

1930 births
2012 deaths
Indian women playback singers
Indian film actresses
Indian voice actresses
Telugu playback singers
Singers from Andhra Pradesh
People from Chittoor district
20th-century Indian singers
20th-century Indian actresses
Actresses in Telugu cinema
20th-century Indian women singers
Actresses from Andhra Pradesh
Film musicians from Andhra Pradesh
Women musicians from Andhra Pradesh